Norm Maginness (born 29 April 1933) is  a former Australian rules footballer who played with Hawthorn in the Victorian Football League (VFL). 		

His son, Scott also played football for Hawthorn and was a member of their 1988 and 1989 premiership winning teams. 

His grandson Finn was drafted by Hawthorn in the 2019 AFL draft and debuted in round 17 of the 2020 AFL season.

Notes

External links 		
		

		
		
Living people		
1933 births		
Australian rules footballers from Victoria (Australia)		
Hawthorn Football Club players